Richard Henson may refer to:
 Richard Henson (cricketer), English cricketer
 Richard A. Henson, American test pilot
 Richard Henson (neurobiologist), professor of cognitive neuroscience